Trevor Stamp may refer to:
 Trevor Stamp, 3rd Baron Stamp, British medical doctor and bacteriologist
 Trevor Stamp, 4th Baron Stamp, British medical doctor and hereditary peer